The Gibbons–Tsarev equation is an integrable  second order nonlinear partial differential equation. In its simplest form, in two dimensions, it may be written as follows:

 

The equation arises in the theory of dispersionless integrable systems, as the condition that solutions of the Benney moment equations may be parametrised by only finitely many of their dependent variables, in this case 2 of them. It was first introduced by John Gibbons and Serguei Tsarev in 1996, This system was also derived, as a condition that two quadratic Hamiltonians should have vanishing Poisson bracket.

Relationship to families of slit maps

The theory of this equation was subsequently developed by Gibbons and Tsarev.
In  independent variables, one looks for solutions of the Benney hierarchy in which only  of the moments  are independent. The resulting system may always be put in Riemann invariant form. Taking the characteristic speeds to be  and the corresponding Riemann invariants to be , they are related to the  zeroth moment  by:

Both these equations hold for all pairs .

This system has solutions parametrised by N functions of a single variable. A class of these may be constructed in terms of N-parameter families of conformal maps from a fixed domain D, normally the complex half -plane, to a similar domain  in the -plane but with N slits. The system can then be understood as the consistency condition between the set of N Loewner equations describing the growth of each slit:

Analytic solution

An elementary family of solutions to the N-dimensional problem may be derived by setting:

where the real parameters  satisfy:

The polynomial on the right hand side has N turning points, with corresponding .
With 
 
the and  satisfy the N-dimensional Gibbons–Tsarev equations.

References

Nonlinear partial differential equations